Briana H. Zamora (born 1973/1974) is an American attorney and judge serving as a justice of the New Mexico Supreme Court since 2021. She is a former judge of the New Mexico Court of Appeals.

Early life and education 

Zamora is a graduate of Cibola High School, she earned a Bachelor of Arts in government and psychology from New Mexico State University and earned her Juris Doctor with honors from the University of New Mexico School of Law in 2000.

Career 

Zamora worked in private practice and as an assistant state attorney general and assistant district attorney prior to becoming a judge.

Judicial career 

Zamora served as a metro court judge from 2009 to 2013. She was elected judge of the Second Judicial District Court in 2013 and served until her appointment to the court of appeals in 2018. She served as a judge of the New Mexico Court of Appeals from December 2018 to 2021.

New Mexico Supreme Court 

On July 15, 2021, Governor Michelle Lujan Grisham appointed Zamora as a justice of the New Mexico Supreme Court to fill the vacancy left by the retirement of Justice Barbara J. Vigil. She was sworn in on August 9, 2021.

References

External links 

1970s births
Living people
21st-century American women lawyers
21st-century American lawyers
21st-century American judges
Justices of the New Mexico Supreme Court
New Mexico lawyers
New Mexico state court judges
New Mexico State University alumni
University of New Mexico School of Law alumni
21st-century American women judges